Black Rock Studio Limited was a British video game developer based in Brighton, England. It was a division of Disney Interactive Studios. The studio was founded by Tony Beckwith in 1998 as Pixel Planet. It was acquired by the Climax Group in 1999 and was renamed Climax Brighton. In 2004, it became Climax Racing, as the Climax Group rebranded its studios. On 28 September 2006, it was acquired by DIS (formerly known as Buena Vista Games in that time) and was eventually renamed Black Rock Studio in 2007. The last game the studio developed for the Climax Group was MotoGP '07, which was completed after its acquisition by Buena Vista Games. The name is derived from a district in Brighton. In early 2011, the company faced lay-offs and was forced to abandon sequels for Pure and Split/Second. Despite good reviews for both games, Disney turned down both sequels to focus on freemium content.

On 30 June 2011, Disney Interactive Studios announced their intent to enter a consultation process on the proposal to close the studios. It was later confirmed that the studio has been shut down and that several 300 ex-employees have formed new studios, including Studio Gobo, West Pier Studio, Roundcube Entertainment, ShortRound Games, and Boss Alien.

Games

References

External links
Official Black Rock Studio website

Companies based in Brighton and Hove
Former subsidiaries of The Walt Disney Company
Video game companies established in 1998
Video game companies disestablished in 2011
Defunct video game companies of the United Kingdom
Video game development companies
Defunct companies of England
1999 mergers and acquisitions
2006 mergers and acquisitions